Henrya may refer to:
 Henrya (gastropod), a genus of gastropods in the family Murchisonellidae
 Henrya (plant), a genus of plants in the family Acanthaceae